The Grand Prix of Miami refers to an intermittent series of American open wheel races held in South Florida dating back to 1926. AAA held one board track race in 1926, and then the facility was destroyed by a hurricane. The popular CART IndyCar World Series debuted in the Miami area in the mid-1980s with a street circuit at Tamiami Park, then returned to race at Bicentennial Park in 1995.

From 1996 to 2010, Homestead-Miami Speedway hosted the Indy cars on the 1.5-mile oval. The CART series participated from 1996 to 2000, then the event was switched to the Indy Racing League for 2001–2010. An additional Champ Car race was held for a brief time at Bayfront Park from 2002 to 2003.

Fulford–Miami Speedway

In 1925, Carl Fisher (who built the Indianapolis Motor Speedway in 1909) was developing Miami Beach and envisioned the Miami area as the winter auto racing capital of the world. Fisher built Fulford–Miami Speedway, the world's fastest -mile board track in nearby Fulford. The outstanding features of the track were the 50 degree banked turns, which required a speed of at least  to keep the cars from sliding down into the infield.

On February 22, 1926, the first AAA Championship Car race in South Florida took place at the facility. A crowd of 20,000 spectators saw Peter DePaolo win the 300-mile (480-km) race, the first and only major race ever held at the facility.

Later in the year, the track was destroyed by the Great Miami Hurricane of 1926. The site of the oval is now occupied by the Diplomat Presidential Country Club.

Race winners

Tamiami Park

Modern American open wheel racing in the Miami area dates back to 1985. In that year, the CART series began racing on a temporary street circuit in Tamiami Park a small outdoor sports facility in the nearby suburb of University Park. The race lasted through 1988, and on two occasions (1987 and 1988) included the CART Marlboro Challenge all star race.

In each of the four years it was held, it served as the CART season finale. The inaugural event in 1985 featured a famous championship battle between the father-and-son duo of Al Unser, Sr. and Al Unser Jr. With Danny Sullivan leading in the waning laps, Unser Jr. was running third, and for the moment, mathematically was going to clinch the championship points title. His father Al Sr. was charging in 5th place, and needed to move up to 4th in order to clinch the title for himself and Penske Racing. Despite personal misgivings about potentially robbing his own son of a championship, Al Sr. passed 4th place Roberto Moreno with only a handful of laps remaining, and held on to the checkered flag. By finishing 4th, Unser, Sr. beat his son in the championship standings by one point.

Rain plagued the race three out of four years, and after the 1988 running, CART officials announced they were not returning. The primary reason was that CART wanted to change the date of the race to either September or to the spring. But promoter Ralph Sanchez did not want to move the race to September due to hurricane season, and did not want to move the race to the spring because it would create a conflict with the IMSA race he also promoted.

A significant portion of the course layout was razed for the construction of FIU Stadium in 1994. Some subtle remains of the circuit were recognizable as of the early 2010s.

Race winners

Marlboro Challenge winners

American Racing Series (Indy Lights) history

Museum Park

In 1995, race promoter Ralph Sanchez brought open wheel racing back to Miami. In the aftermath of Hurricane Andrew, he began redeveloping a devastated area of Homestead, Florida, into the Homestead Motorsports Complex. From 1983 to 1994, Sanchez had promoted very successful IMSA and Trans-Am races at Bayfront Park and Bicentennial Park along Biscayne Bay.

Sanchez revived the Bicentennial Park circuit for one season as a CART race, while Homestead was still under construction. The Bicentennial Park circuit was a semi-permanent circuit which featured purpose-built roads in the park area, along with a temporary segment taking it out on Biscayne Boulevard near the entrance to the Port of Miami.

For the 1995 event, the circuit was run in the opposite direction (clockwise) as it had previously been contested (counter-clockwise). This was done mainly for safety reasons, as the faster Indy cars would find IMSA turn one too tight and prone to accidents. A small kink/chicane was added at the end of the long backstretch (now running northbound) to control speeds. Two of the turns were also widened and slightly re-worked, but that did not significantly alter the layout. The race was won by Jacques Villeneuve, and was the 1995 CART season opener.

Less than three years after the lone CART race in 1995, the layout of the Bicentennial Park racing circuit was partially razed for construction of American Airlines Arena. In the early 2010s, most of the remaining vestiges of the circuit were completely demolished due to the construction of the new Science Museum and Art Museum on the site.

This area was later used for a new circuit, known as the Biscayne Bay Street Circuit. Promoted by Michael Andretti, a 1.3 mile, eight-turn circuit in the area debuted for the 2014–15 Formula E season. In Formula E, the pit lane is used to store cars for the car change that takes place during each race, and the pit lane is away from the start-finish line, close to the pit lane. From Turn 4 to Turn 5 on this circuit the cars will take it out to Biscayne Boulevard, and Turns 5 to 8 (and pit lane) are located very close to the original Bicentennial Park circuit layout. The pit lane is in the same vicinity as the original circuit.

Race winners

Indy Lights

Atlantic Championship

Homestead–Miami Speedway

The Homestead–Miami Indy 300 was an IndyCar race held at Homestead-Miami Speedway in Homestead, Florida from 1996 to 2010.

In 1996, after construction was complete at Homestead Motorsports Complex, CART debuted at 1.5-mile oval with a  event. At the time the layout was a flat, rectangular "mini-Indy" configuration. For each of its years through 2000, the race served as the CART series season opener. CART also used the facility as their venue for "spring training" (off-season testing).

In 2001, the event switched to an IRL Indycar Series event. From 2002 to 2008, the race served as the IndyCar Series season opener. In 2007–2008, the race was held as a night race. After a schedule reorganization, the race was moved to become the season finale for 2009 and 2010 IndyCar Series season. The 2009 race went without a caution, and set a race record average speed of 201.420 mph. The 2010 race was the last IndyCar event at the track in the foreseeable future.

The race went on as scheduled, but Dana's teammates withdrew from the race.

In 2007–2010, the  IndyCar Series race was part of the Speed Jam, a twin-race combo weekend with the Rolex Sports Car Series.

Race winners

Indy Lights

Atlantic Championship

Bayfront Park

The CART series returned to the Miami area once again in 2002. The Grand Prix Americas was a joint CART/ALMS weekend, which revived a part of the original 1983 Bayfront Park course. A  circuit utilized park roads and extended onto Biscayne Boulevard and 3rd and 4th Streets. In 2003, the layout was changed to drop the 3rd/4th Street loop and added a section on Biscayne Boulevard along the north end of the park.

The race briefly provided two annual open wheel races in the Miami area. The IRL's race at Homestead was in the spring, while this race was held in the fall.

Race winners

Atlantic Championship

See also
Grand Prix of Miami (sports car racing)

Notes

Works cited
ChampCarStats.com

References

Former IndyCar Series races
1926 establishments in Florida
Recurring sporting events established in 1926
Sports in Miami